South Okkalapa Township is located in the eastern part of Yangon. The township comprises 14 wards, and shares borders with North Okkalapa Township in the north, North Dagon Township in the east, Yankin Township in the west and Thingangyun Township in the south. South Okkalapa was one of the satellite towns established in 1959. Today, it is a firmly established part of the city, albeit with nominal access to the city's electricity grid and sewer system.

Education
The township has 32 primary schools, nine middle schools and five high schools.

Health
The North Okkalapa General Hospital, an affiliated teaching hospital of the University of Medicine 2, Yangon serves South Okkalapa as well. The South Okkalapa Women's and Children's Hospital is a major specialized hospital in the city.

References

Townships of Yangon